This article lists the South African military chiefs. From 1958 until the first democratic general election in 1994, the present-day South African National Defence Force was known as the South African Defence Force. From 1912 to 1958, the military was known as the Union Defence Force.

In terms of section 202(1) of the Constitution of South Africa, the military command of the Defence Force consists of the Chief of the Defence Force plus the Chiefs of the combat arms (Army, Air Force and Navy) as well as
 the Surgeon-General of the South African Military Health Service;
 the Chief of Joint Operations of the Defence Force;
 the Chief of Defence Intelligence;
 the Chief of Human Resources; and
 the Chief of Logistics.

Head of the Defence Force
The Defence Force consists of the Army, Air Force, Navy, and Medical Service (which was renamed Military Health Service in 1998). The Chief of the South African National Defence Force (SANDF) is the senior military commander and the chiefs of the four services, in addition to the chiefs of Joint Operations, Defence Intelligence, and Corporate Staff, report to him.  the Chief of the SANDF is General Solly Shoke .

Chief of the UDF
The Union Defence Force (UDF) consisted initially of land forces. An aviation corps was formed in 1915 and replaced by the South African Air Force in 1920. A naval branch was added in 1922, and the South African Division of the Royal Navy Volunteer Reserve was incorporated into it in 1942.

In 1951, the defence forces were reorganised into three distinct combat services: the South African Army, the South African Air Force, and the South African Navy. The organisation was renamed "South African Defence Force" in 1958.

The UDF had no overall commander for the first nine and a half years. From January 1922, the Chief of the General Staff, previously responsible only for the Defence Headquarters staff, was the executive commander of the UDF. The title was changed to 'Commandant General UDF' in September 1956.

Chief of the SADF
The UDF was renamed 'South African Defence Force' in November 1958. The Commandant General's title was then changed to 'Commandant General SADF'. It was changed to 'Chief of the SADF' in July 1973, after Admiral Hugo Biermann assumed the post the year before. After South Africa's first democratic election, the South African Defence Force (SADF) became the South African National Defence Force (SANDF).

Chief of the SANDF

The SADF amalgamated with the Azanian People's Liberation Army (APLA), Umkhonto we Sizwe (MK), and the homeland defence forces to form the South African National Defence Force in 1994. The SANDF was based on the existing SADF structure of Army, Air Force, Navy, and Medical Service (which was renamed Military Health Service in 1998).

Chief of the Army
The Chief of the South African Army is the professional head of the Army. There was no separate army commander until 1948.  The post was called 'Director-General of Land Forces' 1948–51 and 'Army Chief of Staff' 1951–66, and has been 'Chief of the Army' since 1966.

Lieutenant General Werndly van der Riet and Major General Mannetjies de Goede spent some time acting as Chief of the Army.

Chief of the Air Force
The Chief of the South African Air Force is the professional head of the Air Force. The post was called 'Director of Air Services' 1920–33, 'Director of Air & Technical Services' 1937–39, 'Director-General of Air Services' 1939–41, 'Director-General of the Air Force' 1941–51, and 'Air Chief of Staff' 1951–66, and has been 'Chief of the Air Force' since 1966.

Chief of the Navy
The Chief of the South African Navy is the professional head of the Navy.  The post was called 'Officer Commanding South African Naval Service' 192232, 'Director, Seaward Defence Force' 194042, 'Director, South African Naval Forces' 194251, 'Naval & Marine Chief of Staff' 195155, and 'Naval Chief of Staff' 195566, and has been 'Chief of the Navy' since 1966.

|-style="text-align:center;"
! colspan=7|Position of the Chief of the Navy did not exist from 1932–39

Surgeon General
The Surgeon General is the Chief of the South African Military Health Service (SAMHS), which was known as the South African Medical Service (SAMS) before 1994.

|-style="text-align:center;"
!colspan=7|
|-

|-style="text-align:center;"
!colspan=7|
|-

Chief of Joint Operations

Chief of Corporate Staff
The Chief of Corporate Staff is responsible for the provision of all staff services for the SANDF.

Sgts Major

Notes

References

Military history of South Africa
South African military personnel
Chiefs
Military of South Africa
South African military leaders